The Philippine Heart Center is a hospital in Central, Quezon City, Philippines, specializing in the treatment of heart ailments. It was established in 1975.

Background
The Philippine Heart Center is a hospital specializing in the treatment of heart ailments. It has rooms for paying patients and charity patients and admits more than 14,000 patients every year, including 3,300 that undergo heart surgery. It holds regular training programs for medical professionals. It as one of the busiest congenital heart surgery centers in Asia, according to its website.  It is currently headed by cardiologist Joel M. Abanilla.

History
The Philippine Heart Center was established through Presidential Decree No. 673 issued by president Ferdinand E. Marcos in 1975. The building is identified with what is referred to as the Marcoses' "edifice complex," defined by architect Gerard Lico as "an obsession and compulsion to build edifices as a hallmark of greatness." The hospital was built using 50% of the national health budget, according to Senator Jose W. Diokno, "while around the country, Filipinos were dying of curable illnesses like TB [tuberculosis], whooping cough, and dysentery."

Its original name was the Philippine Heart Center for Asia and was changed to its current form in 1975. The first patient to be admitted to the PHC was Imelda Francisco, on April 14, 1975.

Cardiovascular specialists including Christiaan Barnard, Denton Cooley, Donald Effler, and Charles Bailey practised there. The first Director of the PHC was  Avenilo P. Aventura (1974-1986), a cardiovascular surgeon who performed many pioneering operations in the Philippines including the first successful renal transplantation in 1970, the first CABG in 1972, and developed and implanted the first ASEAN bioprosthesis, the PHCA porcine valve.

In 2014, the Philippine Heart Center was given a Qmentum International Gold Accreditation for August 2014 – 2017 by Accreditation Canada International for "excellence in hospital practices and safety.

Architecture and design
The hospital building was designed by Filipino architect Jorge Ramos in what has been described as a Brutalist style. It was built in 1975 with a reported cost of almost US$50 million. It was co-founded by Dr. Ludgerio D. Torres.

References

External links
 

Hospital buildings completed in 1975
Hospitals in Quezon City
Government-owned and controlled corporations of the Philippines
Heart disease organizations
Hospitals established in 1975
Buildings and structures in Quezon City
Establishments by Philippine presidential decree